Samsan Station may refer to:

Samsan station (Jungang Line), a railway station in Yangpyeong, Gyeonggi, South Korea
Samsan Gymnasium station, a metro station in Incheon, South Korea

Samsan station (Unsan Line), a closed railway station in Unsan, North P'yŏngan, North Korea